A baníg is a traditional handwoven mat of the Philippines predominantly used as a sleeping mat or a floor mat. Depending on the region of the Philippines, the mat is made of buri (palm), pandanus or reed leaves. The leaves are dried, usually dyed, then cut into strips and woven into mats, which may be plain or intricate.

The Samal of Sulu usually make their mats out of buri leaves. Mats from Basey, Samar use tikog leaves which are dyed in strong colours to make beautiful, unique designs. Banig mats from Bukidnon are made from sodsod grass, a ribless reed endemic to the area.

Terminology

Process

History

Solid, jointless reed

A tradition lives on

Regional/ethnic styles

Bukidnon 
The Bukidnon-Tagoloanen tribe has been weaving the banig mat since time immemorial, using sodsod grass reeds. Not all the women in the tribe are taught how to weave the banig. Only the daughters with the sharpest mind and persistent attitude are taught how to weave ("lala"). The designs woven onto the banig are inspired from nature. The designs woven to this day have usually been learned from the mothers and grandmothers. The Bukidnon-Tagoloanen banig mats are notable for their intricate designs that are formed directly as the grass reeds are woven together (and not inserted onto a finished blank mat). The Bukidnon weavers (or "maglalala") make circular and rectangular banig mats. "The Tagoloanen generally prefer three design forms or guwat...Tinulisan are diamonds, squares, and rectangles arranged in straight rows and columns; binakusan, those arranged diagonally; and bukanayo... or the repetition of small refined design details and arranging them into a crisp gridlike fashion.” The Bukidnon-Tagoloanen mat weaving tradition almost died out, until it was revived in 2012 by the Tagolwanen Women Weavers Association (TWWA), formed to preserve and promote the weaving, as well as the traditions and customs that surround it.

Cordillera

Libertad

Mëranaw

Palawan

Romblon

Samar 
Basey is the banig capital of the Philippines which is located in Samar. It is also believed that it was in Basey, Samar where the tradition of making banigs started. As previously stated, the Banig of Basey, Samar is made of tikog leaves. In 2020, a Samar solon seek for its Banig industry by supporting the tikog industry.

Sulu and Tawi-Tawi

Badjao and Samal

Tausūg

T'boli

Festivals

Banig Festival 
In celebration of Badian's annual fiesta, the Banig Festival showcases the town's various handicrafts and culture, focusing specifically on the native handwoven mats made from Banig. This festival, which is observed every 3 July, is in honor of the town's patron saint, St. James the Great and includes street dancing with costumes made using Banig material, a trade fair showcasing the banig and other native products, and a banig-making contest.

Banigan-Kawayan Festival

Banigan Festival (Antique) 

Banig products has since gained importance prompting local officials and Libertadnons to establish the Banigan Festival to promote banig and sub-products of banig as their One-town-One Product (OTOP). The festival also aims to encourage the banig weavers that the banig they produced could possibly turn into a highly valuable item that can be known not only in the province but also in the international market.

The Banigan festival is very popular for its banig weaving demonstration to visitors and tourists. Varieties of hats, bags, slippers and gowns made of banig are also exhibited during the festival. The celebration is also a tribute to the town's mat weavers who have preserved the priceless tradition of their forefathers.

Banigan Festival (Guimaras)
Barangay Sapal, San Lorenzo, Guimaras has its own Banigan Festival every 15 April, celebrating the use of ‘banig’ or dried pandan leaves as mats and various handicrafts.

It is one of 10, barangay or village-level fiestas observed in Guimaras, aside from the Bayuhan, Kadagatan, Karosahan, Layagan, Niyogyogan, Pangasi, Rosas Sa Baybayon, Sarangola, and Sibiran festivals.

Buri Festival 
Buri (Corypha elata Roxb.), is the official product of San Juan, Ilocos Sur registered under the One Town One Product (OTOP) program of President Gloria Macapagal Arroyo. Also known as century plant and locally as silag, buri is a palm from which three kinds of fibres (buri, raffia, and buntal) are obtained.

Residents consider it "a symbol of their undying love for the cottage industry that they proudly call their own." Though short of the earlier target of weaving a  buri mat, the town surpass the country's unpublished world record of the longest mat woven in Basey, Samar six years prior.

On September 20, 2000, hundreds of people paraded a more than one-kilometer-long mat (.6-mile) as a highlight of Basey town's Banigan-Kawayan Festival.  The one-meter-wide mat was woven for several weeks. However, the feat was not submitted as an entry to the Guinness Book of World Records.

San Juan Mayor Benjamin Sarmiento said that they failed to achieve their target of a four-kilometer-long mat because street dancers and parade revelers used up a great deal of the raw materials for their costumes. Councilor Proceso Ochosa said that the First Buri Festival was meant to promote the buri industry in the local and world markets:
 "The launching of the longest mat is the highlight of our buri festival this year and would be staged annually with the inspiration to get the distinction of having woven the world’s longest mat and promote buri to the world market."

Buri palm trees are abundant in baranggays (villages) Cacandongan, Darao, Malammin, Caronoan, Camanggaan, Immayos Norte and Barbar. Of the 32 barangays in San Juan, half of them are engaged in the buri industry, leading officials to want the town named the "Buri Capital" of the Philippines.

Use in tourism slogan 

It's more fun in the Philippines (2012–present)

MORE FUN. The tourism campaign line for international audience.
HASHTAG FUN. The tourism campaign line for domestic use.

The two logos feature a pixelized version of a "banig" or a handwoven mat traditionally used for sleeping and sitting. Within the pixels is the Philippine map embedded in yellow.

See also
 Amakan
 Pusô

References

External links 
 Banig: the Art of Mat Making
 Tapestry: Philippine Textiles

Beds
Philippine handicrafts